Bethlehem Methodist Church (Bethlehem United Methodist) is a historic church located on Gholson Road southeast of Clarksville, Tennessee. Construction on the church began in 1899, and it was dedicated in 1900. The church was the second building used by its congregation, which originally met in a log church that also served as a school. The congregation had met since at least 1836, the year of its first records; however, the oldest graves in the church cemetery date back to 1821.

Carpenter Alex F. Simpson planned the Gothic Revival church. The one-story frame church features a square tower at both of the front corners. Each tower has a louvered lancet arch window above the first story, which is demarcated by a belt course; the towers are both topped by pyramidal spires with finials. A bargeboard with decorative moldings covers the gable between the two towers; the front entrance, added below the gable in 1958, features a matching bargeboard. The sides of the church each feature three lancet arch windows; while the windows originally had plain glass, stained glass was installed in 1981.

The church was added to the National Register of Historic Places on June 10, 1994. The church's adjacent cemetery is a contributing property to its listing; in addition to its historical association with the church, it contains historically significant boxed grave markers.

References

United Methodist churches in Tennessee
Churches on the National Register of Historic Places in Tennessee
Gothic Revival church buildings in Tennessee
Churches completed in 1900
19th-century Methodist church buildings in the United States
Churches in Montgomery County, Tennessee
Methodist cemeteries
Cemeteries in Tennessee
National Register of Historic Places in Montgomery County, Tennessee